This is a list of European political parties that have been classified as centre-left or far-left on the political spectrum. The categorisation of some parties may vary in different sources.

Literature

Notes

References

Left-wing and far-left parties in Europe
Left-wing politics
Far-left political parties
Far-left politics
Left